Asia Muhammad and Taylor Townsend defeated the defending champion Storm Hunter and her partner Kateřina Siniaková in the final, 6–2, 7–6(7–2) to win the women's doubles tennis title at the 2023 Adelaide International 1.

Ashleigh Barty and Hunter were the reigning champions, but Barty retired from professional tennis in March 2022.

Seeds
All seeds received a bye into the second round.

Draw

Finals

Top half

Bottom half

References

External links
 Main draw

Adelaide International 1 - Women's Doubles
2023 Women's Doubles 1
Adelaide